North Terrace is one of the four terraces that bound the central business and residential district of Adelaide, the capital city of South Australia. It runs east–west, along the northern edge of "the square mile". The western end continues on to Port Road, and the eastern end continues across the Adelaide Parklands as Botanic Road.

North Side of North Terrace
Theoretically, the northern side of North Terrace is part of the Adelaide Parklands. However, much of the space between North Terrace and the River Torrens is occupied by cultural institutions and other public buildings. Starting from West Terrace and travelling east, these buildings include:

(West Terrace)
Parkland
 Royal Adelaide Hospital
 South Australian Health and Medical Research Institute (SAHMRI)
 Adelaide Medical and Nursing Schools (University of Adelaide)
 University of South Australia Cancer Research Institute (previously the site of City Sk8 Park, a skateboarding facility)
(Morphett Street bridge)
Adelaide Convention Centre, Exhibition Halls (partly above the railway station platforms)
Riverside Centre (above the railway station platforms)
InterContinental Hotel (formerly the Hyatt Regency until 2009 Public art around the hotel includes:
 Yerrakartarta, on the forecourt, designed by Darryl Pfitzner Milika, which includes a representation of the Tjilbruke Dreaming story
Knocking from the inside (1998), on the northern plaza, created by Iranian-Australian artist Hossein Valamanesh 
Adelaide railway station building
Adelaide Casino (inside the historic station building)
Old Parliament House - the original South Australian Parliament building
Parliament House
The Adelaide Festival Centre and Elder Park are behind Parliament House, between North Terrace and the River Torrens – also accessible from King William Road
(King William Road)
 Government House, the official residence of the governor of South Australia
 The historic Torrens Parade Ground is behind Government House, between North Terrace and the River Torrens – accessible from King William Road
 The South African War Memorial stands in front of Government House on a traffic island at the corner of North Terrace and King William Road
The Jubilee 150 Walkway commences in front of Government House
National War Memorial
(Kintore Avenue)
State Library of South Australia
Institute Building (1859)
Spence Wing
Mortlock Wing (1884)
South Australian Museum
Art Gallery of South Australia
University of Adelaide (original campus, now called the Main campus):
Mitchell Building
Elder Conservatorium of Music
Bonython Hall
Napier Building
Ligertwood Building
The Jubilee 150 Walkway finishes in front of the Napier/Ligertwood plaza.
University of South Australia (originally the South Australian School of Mines and Industries/Adelaide Technical High School, now called the City East campus)
(Frome Road)
The old Royal Adelaide Hospital
Adelaide Botanic Gardens
(East Terrace)
Adelaide Botanic Gardens
National Wine Centre of Australia

South Side of North Terrace
Starting at West Terrace and travelling east, the southern side of the street includes:

(West Terrace)
The Newmarket Hotel
Assorted accommodation, businesses and medical practices
Many buildings forming the City West campus of the University of South Australia
The Lion Arts Centre (in the old Fowler's Lion Flour Factory building)
(Morphett Street bridge)
The historic Holy Trinity Church (Anglican)
Assorted accommodation, businesses and government offices
The Dame Roma Mitchell building
Assorted accommodation and various Adelaide head offices (e.g. MyBudget, Origin Energy)
(King William Street)
The former Adelaide head office of the Westpac Bank
The exclusive, historic and discreetly labelled Adelaide Club (for gentlemen)
The Myer Centre, part of the Rundle Mall shopping precinct
The exclusive, historic and unlabelled Queen Adelaide Club (for ladies)
"Gawler Chambers", the former Adelaide offices of the South Australian Company
(Gawler Place)
Assorted businesses and medical practices
David Jones, part of the Rundle Mall shopping precinct
Assorted businesses, medical practices and University of Adelaide buildings
The historic Scots Church (originally Free Church of Scotland, then Presbyterian, now Uniting Church)
(Pulteney Street)
Various buildings occupied by the University of Adelaide
The historic and architecturally elaborate Freemasons' Hall, designed by John Quintin Bruce, a prominent Adelaide architect, who also designed Electra House in King William Street and Carclew on Montefiore Hill.
The Waterhouse house
Assorted businesses
The First Church of Christ, Scientist ("Christian Scientist" Church)
(Frome Street)
Assorted businesses
The historic Ayers House
19th century Terrace houses
The historic Botanic Hotel
(East Terrace)
Parkland

Glenelg tram extensions
In October 2007, the extension of the Glenelg tram line from Victoria Square to the University of South Australia City West campus was completed. In 2010, a further extension along the remainder of North Terrace to continue along Port Road to the Adelaide Entertainment Centre was opened. Construction of a new junction, branch lines along the eastern end of North Terrace and King William Road and four new stops began in July/August 2017 and opened on 13 October 2018.

Picture gallery

See also
 Australia Award for Urban Design

References

Streets in Adelaide